The Tenniseum, also known as the Musée du Tennis or the Musée de Roland-Garros, is a tennis museum located in the Stade Roland Garros in the 16th arrondissement at 2, avenue Gordon-Bennett, Paris, France. It is open daily except Mondays; an admission fee is charged.

The museum was created in 2003 by the Fédération Française de Tennis (French Federation of Tennis), and currently contains about 1000 m2 of exhibition space. Its permanent collection is primarily multimedia (video displays) and photographs; it also contains roughly a hundred tennis racquets dating from 1920 to the present.

See also
 List of museums in Paris
International Tennis Hall of Fame

References
Tenniseum
 Expo Revue article (French)
 VisoTerra description (French)

History of tennis
Museums in Paris
Sports museums
Tennis in France
Buildings and structures in the 16th arrondissement of Paris